The 1971 National Formula Ford Driver to Europe Series was an Australian motor racing competition open to Formula Ford racing cars. It was the second annual Australian series for Formula Fords.

The series was won by Larry Perkins driving an Elfin 600.

Schedule

The series was contested over twelve rounds.

Points system
Points were awarded on a 10-9-8-7-6-5-4-3-2-1 basis for the first ten places at each round except the Sandown round, for which double points were awarded.

Series results

All cars were powered by a standard Ford Cortina 1600 GT engine.

References

External links
 Personal photos of Australian motor racing '50s to '70s (including the top six placegetters in the 1971 Formula Ford Driver to Europe Series, forums.autosport.com
 1971 Formula Ford Driver to Europe Series, www.formulaford.com.au, as archived at web.archive.org

Formula Ford Driver to Europe Series
Australian Formula Ford Series